The 1990 Special Honours in New Zealand were three special honours lists: the first was dated 6 February 1990 and made appointments to the Order of New Zealand and the Queen's Service Order; the second was dated 17 May 1990 made awards of the Polar Medal; and the third was dated 27 November 1990, to recognise the incoming governor-general, Dame Catherine Tizard.

Order of New Zealand (ONZ)
Additional member
 Her Majesty Queen Elizabeth The Queen Mother.
 Dr Thomas Allen Monro Curnow .
 The Honourable Michael John Duffy .
 Nene Janet Paterson Clutha (Janet Frame) .
 Arthur Leslie Lydiard .
 Sir Guy Richardson Powles .

Honorary member
 Sir Shridath Surendranath Ramphal (Sonny Ramphal) .

Order of St Michael and St George

Dame Grand Cross (GCMG)
 Dame Catherine Anne Tizard  – Governor-General Designate of New Zealand.

Companion of the Queen's Service Order (QSO)

For community service
Extra companion
 Her Royal Highness The Princess Royal .

Additional companion
 Beverley Gwendolen, Lady Reeves.

For public services
Additional companion
 The Most Reverend Sir Paul Alfred Reeves  – Principal Companion of the Queen's Service Order and Governor-General and Commander-in-Chief in and over New Zealand since 1985.

Ordinary companion
 The Right Honourable Sir William (Frederick Payne) Heseltine   – private secretary to The Queen since 1986.

Polar Medal
With clasp "Antarctic 1978–88"
 Alexander Richard Pyne – of Wellington. For good services as a member of New Zealand expeditions to Antarctica in recent years.
 Garth Edwin Varcoe – of Christchurch. For good services as a member of New Zealand expeditions to Antarctica in recent years.

References

Special honours
1990 awards